Aminolevulinic acid dehydratase (porphobilinogen synthase, or ALA dehydratase, or aminolevulinate dehydratase) is an enzyme that in humans is encoded by the ALAD gene. Porphobilinogen synthase (or ALA dehydratase, or aminolevulinate dehydratase) synthesizes porphobilinogen through the asymmetric condensation of two molecules of aminolevulinic acid. All natural tetrapyrroles, including hemes, chlorophylls and vitamin B12, share porphobilinogen as a common precursor. Porphobilinogen synthase is the prototype morpheein.

Function 
It catalyzes the following reaction, the second step of the biosynthesis of porphyrin:
2 5-Aminolevulinic acid  porphobilinogen + 2 H2O

It therefore catalyzes the condensation of 2 molecules of 5-aminolevulinate to form porphobilinogen (a precursor of heme, cytochromes and other hemoproteins). This reaction is the first common step in the biosynthesis of all biological tetrapyrroles. Zinc is essential for enzymatic activity.

Structure 
The structural basis for allosteric regulation of Porphobilinogen synthase (PBGS) is modulation of a quaternary structure equilibrium between octamer and hexamer (via dimers), which is represented schematically as 6mer* ↔ 2mer* ↔ 2mer ↔ 8mer.  The * represents a reorientation between two domains of each subunit that occurs in the dissociated state because it is sterically forbidden in the larger multimers.

PBGS is encoded by a single gene and each PBGS multimer is composed of multiple copies of the same protein. Each PBGS subunit consists of a ~300 residue αβ-barrel domain, which houses the enzyme's active site in its center, and a >25 residue N-terminal arm domain.  Allosteric regulation of PBGS can be described in terms of the orientation of the αβ-barrel domain with respect to the N-terminal arm domain.

Each N-terminal arm has up to two interactions with other subunits in a PBGS multimer. One of these interactions helps to stabilize a "closed" conformation of the active site lid.  The other interaction restricts solvent access from the other end of the αβ-barrel.

In the inactive multimeric state, the N-terminal arm domain is not involved in the lid-stabilizing interaction, and in the crystal structure of the inactive assembly, the active site lid is disordered.

Allosteric regulators 
As a nearly universal enzyme with a highly conserved active site, PBGS would not be a prime target for the development of antimicrobials and/or herbicides.  To the contrary, allosteric sites can be much more phylogenetically variable than active sites, thus presenting more drug development opportunities.

Phylogenetic variation in PBGS allostery leads to the framing of discussion of PBGS allosteric regulation in terms of intrinsic and extrinsic factors.

Intrinsic allosteric regulators

Magnesium
The allosteric magnesium ion lies at the highly hydrated interface of two pro-octamer dimers.  It appears to be easily dissociable, and it has been shown that hexamers accumulate when magnesium is removed in vitro.

pH
Though it is not common to consider hydronium ions as allosteric regulators, in the case of PBGS, side chain protonation at locations other than the active site has been shown to affect the quaternary structure equilibrium, and thus to affect the rate of its catalyzed reaction as well.

Extrinsic allosteric regulators

Small molecule hexamer stabilization
Inspection of the PBGS 6mer* reveals a surface cavity that is not present in the 8mer.  Small molecule binding to this phylogenetically variable cavity has been proposed to stabilize 6mer* of the targeted PBGS and consequently inhibit activity.

Such allosteric regulators are known as morphlocks because they lock PBGS in a specific morpheein form (6mer*).

Lead poisoning
ALAD enzymatic activity is inhibited by lead, beginning at blood lead levels that were once considered to be safe (<10 μg/dL) and continuing to correlate negatively across the range from 5 to 95 μg/dL. Inhibition of ALAD by lead leads to anemia primarily because it both inhibits heme synthesis and shortens the lifespan of circulating red blood cells, but also by stimulating the excessive production of the hormone erythropoietin, leading to inadequate maturation of red cells from their progenitors. A defect in the ALAD structural gene can cause increased sensitivity to lead poisoning and acute hepatic porphyria. Alternatively spliced transcript variants encoding different isoforms have been identified.

Deficiency  
A deficiency of porphobilinogen synthase is usually acquired (rather than hereditary) and can be caused by heavy metal poisoning, especially lead poisoning, as the enzyme is very susceptible to inhibition by heavy metals.

Hereditary insufficiency of porphobilinogen synthase is called porphobilinogen synthase (or ALA dehydratase) deficiency poprhyria. It is an extremely rare cause of porphyria, with less than 10 cases ever reported.  All disease associated protein variants favor hexamer formation relative to the wild type human enzyme.

PBGS as the prototype morpheein 
The morpheein model of allostery exemplified by PBGS adds an additional layer of understanding to potential mechanisms for regulation of protein function and complements the increased focus that the protein science community is placing on protein structure dynamics.

This model illustrates how the dynamics of phenomena such as alternate protein conformations, alternate oligomeric states, and transient protein-protein interactions can be harnessed for allosteric regulation of catalytic activity.

References

External links 
 
 
 http://www.omim.org/entry/125270?search=pbgs&highlight=pbgs

Further reading 

 
 
 
 
 
 
 
 
 
 
 
 
 
 
 
 
 

EC 4.2.1